Nicolas Paul Stéphane Sarközy de Nagy-Bocsa (born 28 January 1955) is a French politician who served as President of France from 2007 to 2012.

Born in Paris, he is of Hungarian, Greek Jewish, and French origin. Mayor of Neuilly-sur-Seine from 1983 to 2002, he was Minister of the Budget under Prime Minister Édouard Balladur (1993–1995) during François Mitterrand's second term. During Jacques Chirac's second presidential term he served as Minister of the Interior and as Minister of Finances. He was the leader of the Union for a Popular Movement (UMP) party from 2004 to 2007.

He won the 2007 French presidential election by a 53.1% to 46.9% margin against Ségolène Royal, the Socialist Party (PS) candidate. During his term, he faced the financial crisis of 2007–2008 (causing a recession, the European sovereign debt crisis), the Russo-Georgian War (for which he negotiated a ceasefire) and the Arab Spring (especially in Tunisia, Libya, and Syria). He initiated the reform of French universities (2007) and the pension reform (2010). He married Italian-French singer-songwriter Carla Bruni in 2008 at the Élysée Palace in Paris.

In the 2012 French presidential election, Sarkozy was defeated by the PS candidate François Hollande, by a 3.2% margin. After leaving the presidential office, Sarkozy vowed to retire from public life before coming back in 2014, being subsequently reelected as UMP leader (renamed The Republicans in 2015). Being defeated at the Republican presidential primary in 2016, he retired from public life. He was charged with corruption by French prosecutors in two cases, notably concerning the alleged Libyan interference in the 2007 French elections. In 2021, Sarkozy was convicted of corruption in two separate trials. His first conviction resulted in him receiving a sentence of three years, two of them suspended and one in prison; he has appealed against the ruling. For his second conviction, he received a one-year sentence, which he is allowed to serve under home confinement.

Personal life

Family background 

Sarkozy was born in Paris, and is the son of Pál István Ernő Sárközy de Nagy-Bócsa (—in some sources Nagy-Bócsay Sárközy Pál István Ernő), (5 May 1928 – 4 March 2023), a Protestant Hungarian aristocrat, and Andrée Jeanne "Dadu" Mallah (12 October 1925 – 12 December 2017), whose Ottoman Greek Jewish grandfather converted to Catholicism to marry Sarkozy's French Catholic maternal grandmother. They were married in the Saint-François-de-Sales church, 17th arrondissement of Paris, on 8 February 1950, and divorced in 1959.

Early life
During Sarkozy's childhood, his father founded his own advertising agency and became wealthy. The family lived in a mansion owned by Sarkozy's maternal grandfather, Benedict Mallah, in the 17th arrondissement of Paris. The family later moved to Neuilly-sur-Seine, one of the wealthiest communes of the Île-de-France région immediately west of Paris. According to Sarkozy, his staunchly Gaullist grandfather was more of an influence on him than his father, whom he rarely saw. Sarkozy was raised Catholic.

Sarkozy said that being kept at a distance by his father shaped much of who he is today. He also has said that, in his early years, he felt inferior in relation to his wealthier and taller classmates. "What made me who I am now is the sum of all the humiliations suffered during childhood", he said later.

Education
Sarkozy was enrolled in the Lycée Chaptal, a well regarded public middle and high school in Paris' 8th arrondissement, where he failed his sixième. His family then sent him to the Cours Saint-Louis de Monceau, a private Catholic school in the 17th arrondissement, where he was reportedly a mediocre student, but where he nonetheless obtained his baccalauréat in 1973.

Sarkozy enrolled at the Université Paris X Nanterre, where he graduated with an M.A. in private law and, later, with a D.E.A. degree in business law. Paris X Nanterre had been the starting place for the May '68 student movement and was still a stronghold of leftist students. Described as a quiet student, Sarkozy soon joined the right-wing student organization, in which he was very active. He completed his military service as a part-time Air Force cleaner.

After graduating from university, Sarkozy entered Sciences Po, where he studied between 1979 and 1981, but failed to graduate due to an insufficient command of the English language.

After passing the bar, Sarkozy became a lawyer specializing in business and family law and was one of Silvio Berlusconi's French lawyers.

Marriages

Marie-Dominique Culioli
Sarkozy married his first wife, Marie-Dominique Culioli, on 23 September 1982; her father was a pharmacist from Vico (a village north of Ajaccio, Corsica), her uncle was Achille Peretti, the mayor of Neuilly-sur-Seine from 1947 to 1983 and Sarkozy's political mentor. They had two sons, Pierre (born in 1985), now a hip-hop producer, and Jean (born in 1986) now a local politician in the city of Neuilly-sur-Seine where Sarkozy started his own political career. Sarkozy's best man was the prominent right-wing politician Charles Pasqua, later to become a political opponent. Sarkozy divorced Culioli in 1996, after they had been separated for several years.

Cécilia Ciganer-Albéniz
As mayor of Neuilly-sur-Seine, Sarkozy met former fashion model and public relations executive Cécilia Ciganer-Albéniz (great-granddaughter of composer Isaac Albéniz and daughter of a Moldovan father), when he officiated at her wedding to television host Jacques Martin. In 1988, she left her husband for Sarkozy, and divorced one year later. She and Sarkozy married in October 1996, with witnesses Martin Bouygues and Bernard Arnault. They have one son, Louis, born 23 April 1997.

Between 2002 and 2005, the couple often appeared together on public occasions, with Cécilia Sarkozy acting as the chief aide for her husband. On 25 May 2005, however, the Swiss newspaper Le Matin revealed that she had left Sarkozy for Moroccan national Richard Attias, head of Publicis in New York. There were other accusations of a private nature in Le Matin, which led to Sarkozy suing the paper. In the meantime, he was said to have had an affair with a journalist of Le Figaro, Anne Fulda.

Sarkozy and Cécilia ultimately divorced on 15 October 2007, soon after his election as president.

Carla Bruni

Less than a month after separating from Cécilia, Sarkozy met Italian-born singer, songwriter and former fashion model Carla Bruni at a dinner party, and soon entered into a relationship with her. They married on 2 February 2008 at the Élysée Palace in Paris.

The couple have a daughter, Giulia, born on 19 October 2011. It was the first time a French president has publicly had a child while in office.

Personal wealth
Sarkozy declared to the Constitutional Council a net worth of €2 million, most of the assets being in the form of life insurance policies. As the French President, one of his first actions was to give himself a pay raise: his yearly salary went from €101,000 to €240,000, matching other European officeholders. He is also entitled to a mayoral, parliamentarian and presidential pension as a former Mayor of Neuilly-sur-Seine, member of the National Assembly and President of France.

Early political career
Sarkozy is recognized by French parties on both the Right and Left as a skilled politician and striking orator. His supporters within France emphasize his charisma, political innovation and willingness to "make a dramatic break" amid mounting disaffection against "politics as usual". Overall, he is considered more pro-American and pro-Israeli than most French politicians.

From 2004 to 2007, Sarkozy was president of the Union pour un Mouvement Populaire (UMP), France's major right-wing political party, and he was Minister of the Interior in the government of Prime Minister Dominique de Villepin, with the honorific title of Minister of State, making him effectively the number three official in the French State after President Jacques Chirac and Villepin. His ministerial responsibilities included law enforcement and working to co-ordinate relationships between the national and local governments, as well as Minister of Worship: in this role he created the French Council of the Muslim Faith (CFCM). Previously, he was a député in the French National Assembly. He was forced to resign this position in order to accept his ministerial appointment. He previously also held several ministerial posts, including Finance Minister.

In Government: 1993–1995
Sarkozy's political career began when he was 23, when he became a city councillor in Neuilly-sur-Seine. A member of the Neo-Gaullist party RPR, he went on to be elected mayor of that town, after the death of the incumbent mayor Achille Peretti. Sarkozy had been close to Peretti, as his mother was Peretti's secretary. A more senior RPR councillor, Charles Pasqua, wanted to become mayor, and asked Sarkozy to organize his campaign. Instead Sarkozy took that opportunity to propel himself into the office of mayor. He was the youngest mayor of any town in France with a population of over 50,000. He served from 1983 to 2002. In 1988, he became a deputy in the National Assembly.

In 1993, Sarkozy was in the national news for personally negotiating with the "Human Bomb", a man who had taken small children hostages in a kindergarten in Neuilly. The "Human Bomb" was killed after two days of talks by policemen of the RAID, who entered the school stealthily while the attacker was resting.

At the same time, from 1993 to 1995, he was Minister for the Budget and spokesman for the executive in the cabinet of Prime Minister Édouard Balladur. Throughout most of his early career, Sarkozy had been seen as a protégé of Jacques Chirac. During his tenure, he increased France's public debt more than any other French Budget Minister, by the equivalent of €200 billion (US$260 billion) (FY 1994–1996). The first two budgets he submitted to the parliament (budgets for FY1994 and FY1995) assumed a yearly budget deficit equivalent to six percent of GDP. According to the Maastricht Treaty, the French yearly budget deficit may not exceed three percent of France's GDP.

In 1995, he spurned Chirac and backed Édouard Balladur for President of France. After Chirac won the election, Sarkozy lost his position as Minister for the Budget, and found himself outside the circles of power.

However, he returned after the right-wing defeat at the 1997 parliamentary election, as the number two candidate of the RPR. When the party leader Philippe Séguin resigned, in 1999, he took the leadership of the Neo-Gaullist party. But it obtained its worst result at the 1999 European Parliament election, winning 12.7% of the votes, less than the dissident Rally for France of Charles Pasqua. Sarkozy lost the RPR leadership.

In 2002, however, after his re-election as President of the French Republic (see 2002 French presidential election), Chirac appointed Sarkozy as Minister of the Interior in the cabinet of Prime Minister Jean-Pierre Raffarin, despite Sarkozy's support of Edouard Balladur for President in 1995. Following Chirac's 14 July keynote speech on road safety, Sarkozy as Minister of the Interior pushed through new legislation leading to the mass purchase of speed cameras and a campaign to increase the awareness of dangers on the roads.

In the cabinet reshuffle of 30 April 2004, Sarkozy became Finance Minister. Tensions continued to build between Sarkozy and Chirac and within the UMP party, as Sarkozy's intentions of becoming head of the party after the resignation of Alain Juppé became clear.

In party elections of 10 November 2004, Sarkozy became leader of the UMP with 85% of the vote. In accordance with an agreement with Chirac, he resigned as Finance Minister. Sarkozy's ascent was marked by the division of UMP between sarkozystes, such as Sarkozy's "first lieutenant", Brice Hortefeux, and Chirac loyalists, such as Jean-Louis Debré.

Sarkozy was made Chevalier de la Légion d'honneur (Knight of the Legion of Honour) by President Chirac in February 2005. He was re-elected on 13 March 2005 to the National Assembly. (As required by the constitution, he had to resign as a deputy when he became minister in 2002.)

On 31 May 2005 the main French news radio station France Info reported a rumour that Sarkozy was to be reappointed Minister of the Interior in the government of Dominique de Villepin without resigning from the UMP leadership. This was confirmed on 2 June 2005, when the members of the government were officially announced.

First term as Minister of the Interior: 2002–2004

Towards the end of his first term as Minister of the Interior, in 2004, Sarkozy was the most divisive conservative politician in France, according to polls conducted at the beginning of 2004.

Sarkozy has sought to ease the sometimes tense relationships between the general French population and the Muslim community. Unlike the Catholic Church in France with their official leaders or Protestants with their umbrella organisations, the French Muslim community had a lack of structure with no group that could legitimately deal with the French government on their behalf. Sarkozy supported the foundation in May 2003 of the private non-profit Conseil français du culte musulman ("French Council of the Muslim Faith"), an organisation meant to be representative of French Muslims. In addition, Sarkozy has suggested amending the 1905 law on the separation of Church and State, mostly in order to be able to finance mosques and other Muslim institutions with public funds so that they are less reliant on money from outside France. It was not followed by any concrete measure.

Minister of Finance: 2004
During his short appointment as Minister of Finance, Sarkozy was responsible for introducing a number of policies. The degree to which this reflected libéralisme (a hands-off approach to running the economy) or more traditional French state dirigisme (intervention) is controversial. He resigned the day following his election as president of the UMP.

 In September 2004, Sarkozy oversaw the reduction of the government ownership stake in France Télécom from 50.4 percent to 41 percent.
 Sarkozy backed a partial nationalisation of the large engineering company Alstom decided by his predecessor when the company was exposed to bankruptcy in 2003.
 In June 2004, Sarkozy reached an agreement with the major retail chains in France to concertedly lower prices on household goods by an average of two percent; the success of this measure is disputed, with studies suggesting that the decrease was close to one percent in September.
 Taxes: Sarkozy avoided taking a position on the ISF (solidarity tax on wealth). This is considered an ideological symbol by many on the left and right. Some in the business world and on the liberal right, such as Alain Madelin, wanted it abolished. For Sarkozy, that would have risked being categorised by the left as a gift to the richest classes of society at a time of economic difficulties.

Second term as Minister of the Interior: 2005–2007

During his second term at the Ministry of the Interior, Sarkozy was initially more discreet about his ministerial activities: instead of focusing on his own topic of law and order, many of his declarations addressed wider issues, since he was expressing his opinions as head of the UMP party.

However, the civil unrest in autumn 2005 put law enforcement in the spotlight again. Sarkozy was accused of having provoked the unrest by calling young delinquents from housing projects a "rabble" ("racaille") in Argenteuil near Paris, and controversially suggested cleansing the minority suburbs with a Kärcher. After the accidental death of two youths, which sparked the riots, Sarkozy first blamed it on "hoodlums" and gangsters. These remarks were sharply criticised by many on the left wing and by a member of his own government, Delegate Minister for Equal Opportunities Azouz Begag.

After the rioting, he made a number of announcements on future policy: selection of immigrants,  greater tracking of immigrants, and a reform on the 1945 ordinance government justice measures for young delinquents.

UMP leader: 2004–2007

Before he was elected President of France, Sarkozy was president of UMP, the French conservative party, elected with 85 percent of the vote. During his presidency, the number of members increased significantly. In 2005, he supported a "yes" vote in the French referendum on the European Constitution, but the "No" vote won.

Throughout 2005, Sarkozy called for radical changes in France's economic and social policies. These calls culminated in an interview with Le Monde on 8 September 2005, during which he claimed that the French had been misled for 30 years by false promises. Among other issues:
 he called for a simplified and "fairer" taxation system, with fewer loopholes and a maximum taxation rate (all direct taxes combined) at 50 percent of revenue;
 he approved measures reducing or denying social support to unemployed workers who refuse work offered to them;
 he pressed for a reduction in the budget deficit, claiming that the French state had been living off credit for some time.

Such policies are what are called in France libéral (that is, in favour of laissez-faire economic policies) or, with a pejorative undertone, ultra-libéral. Sarkozy rejects this label of libéral and prefers to call himself a pragmatist.

Sarkozy opened another avenue of controversy by declaring that he wanted a reform of the immigration system, with quotas designed to admit the skilled workers needed by the French economy. He also wanted to reform the current French system for foreign students, saying that it enabled foreign students to take open-ended curricula in order to obtain residency in France; instead, he wanted to select the best students to the best curricula in France.

In early 2006, the French parliament adopted a controversial bill known as DADVSI, which reforms French copyright law. Since his party was divided on the issue, Sarkozy stepped in and organised meetings between various parties involved. Later, groups such as the Odebi League and EUCD.info alleged that Sarkozy personally and unofficially supported certain amendments to the law, which enacted strong penalties against designers of peer-to-peer systems.

Presidential election: 2007

Sarkozy was a likely candidate for the presidency in 2007; in an oft-repeated comment made on television channel France 2, when asked by a journalist whether he thought about the presidential election when he shaved in the morning, Sarkozy commented, "Not just when I shave".

On 14 January 2007, Sarkozy was chosen by the UMP to be its candidate in the 2007 presidential election. Sarkozy, who was running unopposed, won 98 percent of the votes. Of the 327,000 UMP members who could vote, 69 percent participated in the online ballot.

In February 2007, Sarkozy appeared on a televised debate on TF1 where he expressed his support for affirmative action and the freedom to work overtime. Despite his opposition to same-sex marriage, he advocated civil unions and the possibility for same-sex partners to inherit under the same regime as married couples. The law was voted in July 2007.

On 7 February, Sarkozy decided in favour of a projected second, non-nuclear, aircraft carrier for the national Navy (adding to the nuclear Charles de Gaulle), during an official visit in Toulon with Defence Minister Michèle Alliot-Marie. "This would allow permanently having an operational ship, taking into account the constraints of maintenance", he explained.

On 21 March, President Jacques Chirac announced his support for Sarkozy. Chirac pointed out that Sarkozy had been chosen as presidential candidate for the ruling UMP party, and said: "So it is totally natural that I give him my vote and my support." To focus on his campaign, Sarkozy stepped down as Minister of the Interior on 26 March.

During the campaign, rival candidates had accused Sarkozy of being a "candidate for brutality" and of presenting hard-line views about France's future. Opponents also accused him of courting conservative voters in policy-making in a bid to capitalise on right-wing sentiments among some communities. However, his popularity was sufficient to see him polling as the frontrunner throughout the later campaign period, consistently ahead of rival Socialist candidate, Ségolène Royal.

The first round of the presidential election was held on 22 April 2007. Sarkozy came in first with 31.18 percent of the votes, ahead of Ségolène Royal of the Socialists with 25.87 percent. In the second round, Sarkozy came out on top to win the election with 53.06 percent of the votes ahead of Ségolène Royal with 46.94 percent. In his speech immediately following the announcement of the election results, Sarkozy stressed the need for France's modernisation, but also called for national unity, mentioning that Royal was in his thoughts. In that speech, he claimed "The French have chosen to break with the ideas, habits and behaviour of the past. I will restore the value of work, authority, merit and respect for the nation."

Presidency of France

Inauguration

On 6 May 2007, Nicolas Sarkozy became the sixth person to be elected President of the Fifth Republic (which was established in 1958), and the 23rd President in French history.

The official transfer of power from Chirac to Sarkozy took place on 16 May at 11:00 am (9:00 UTC) at the Élysée Palace, where he was given the authorization codes of the French nuclear arsenal. In the afternoon, the new president flew to Berlin to meet with German Chancellor Angela Merkel.

Under Sarkozy's government, François Fillon replaced Dominique de Villepin as Prime Minister. Sarkozy appointed Bernard Kouchner, the left-wing founder of Médecins Sans Frontières, as his Foreign Minister, leading to Kouchner's expulsion from the Socialist Party. In addition to Kouchner, three more Sarkozy ministers are from the left, including Éric Besson, who served as Ségolène Royal's economic adviser at the beginning of her campaign. Sarkozy also appointed seven women to form a total cabinet of 15; one, Justice Minister Rachida Dati, is the first woman of Northern African origin to serve in a French cabinet. Of the 15, two attended the elite École nationale d'administration (ENA). The ministers were reorganised, with the controversial creation of a 'Ministry of Immigration, Integration, National Identity and Co-Development'—given to his right-hand man Brice Hortefeux—and of a 'Ministry of Budget, Public Accounts and Civil Administration'—handed out to Éric Wœrth, supposed to prepare the replacement of only a third of all civil servants who retire. However, after 17 June parliamentary elections, the Cabinet was adjusted to 15 ministers and 16 deputy ministers, totalling 31 officials.

Sarkozy broke with the custom of amnestying traffic tickets and of releasing thousands of prisoners from overcrowded jails on Bastille Day, a tradition that Napoleon had started in 1802 to commemorate the storming of the Bastille during the French Revolution.

In 2007 and 2008, French President Nicolas Sarkozy, Canadian Prime Minister Stephen Harper, and Quebec Premier Jean Charest all spoke in favour of a Canada – EU free trade agreement.  In October 2008, Sarkozy became the first French President to address the National Assembly of Quebec.  In his speech he spoke out against Quebec separatism, but recognized Quebec as a nation within Canada.  He said that, to France, Canada was a friend, and Quebec was family.

Release of hostages
Shortly after taking office, Sarkozy began negotiations with Colombian president Álvaro Uribe and the left-wing guerrilla FARC, regarding the release of hostages held by the rebel group, especially Franco-Colombian politician Ingrid Betancourt. According to some sources, Sarkozy himself asked for Uribe to release FARC's "chancellor" Rodrigo Granda.

Furthermore, he announced on 24 July 2007, that French and European representatives had obtained the extradition of the Bulgarian nurses detained in Libya to their country. In exchange, he signed with Muammar Gaddafi security, health care and immigration pacts—and a $230 million (168 million euros) MILAN antitank missile sale. The contract was the first made by Libya since 2004, and was negotiated with MBDA, a subsidiary of EADS. Another 128 million euro contract would have been signed, according to Tripoli, with EADS for a TETRA radio system. The Socialist Party (PS) and the Communist Party (PCF) criticised a "state affair" and a "barter" with a "Rogue state". The leader of the PS, François Hollande, requested the opening of a parliamentary investigation.

Green policy
On 8 June 2007, during the 33rd G8 summit in Heiligendamm, Sarkozy set a goal of reducing French CO2 emissions by 50 percent by 2050 in order to prevent global warming. He then pushed forward Socialist Dominique Strauss-Kahn as European nominee to the International Monetary Fund (IMF). Critics alleged that Sarkozy proposed to nominate Strauss-Kahn as managing director of the IMF to deprive the Socialist Party of one of its more popular figures.

In 2010, a study of :Yale and Columbia universities ranked France the most respectful country of the G20 concerning the environment.

Economic policy
The Union for a Popular Movement (UMP), Sarkozy's party, won a majority at the June 2007 legislative election, although by less than expected. In July, the UMP majority, seconded by the Nouveau Centre, ratified one of Sarkozy's electoral promises, which was to partially revoke the inheritance tax. The inheritance tax formerly provided €8 billion in revenue.

Sarkozy's UMP majority prepared a budget that reduced taxes, in particular for upper middle-class people, allegedly in an effort to boost GDP growth, but did not reduce state expenditures. He was criticised by the European Commission for doing so.

On 23 July 2008, parliament voted the "loi de modernisation de l'économie" (Modernization of the Economy Law) which loosened restrictions on retail prices and reduced limitations on the creation of businesses. The Government has also made changes to long-standing French work-hour regulations, allowing employers to negotiate overtime with employees and making all hours worked past the traditional French 35-hour week tax-free.

However, as a result of the global financial crisis that came to a head in September 2008, Sarkozy has returned to the state interventionism of his predecessors, declaring that "laissez-faire capitalism is over" and denouncing the "dictatorship of the market". Confronted with the suggestion that he had become a socialist, he responded: "Have I become socialist? Perhaps." He has also pledged to create 100,000 state-subsidised jobs.

Security policy
Sarkozy's government issued a decree on 7 August 2007 to generalise a voluntary biometric profiling program of travellers in airports. The program, called 'Parafes', was to use fingerprints. The new database would be interconnected with the Schengen Information System (SIS) as well as with a national database of wanted persons (FPR). The Commission nationale de l'informatique et des libertés (CNIL) protested against this new decree, opposing itself to the recording of fingerprints and to the interconnection between the SIS and the FPR.

Constitutional reform
On 21 July 2008, the French parliament passed constitutional reforms which Sarkozy had made one of the key pledges of his presidential campaign. The vote was 539 to 357, one vote over the three-fifths majority required; the changes are not yet finalized. They would introduce a two-term limit for the presidency, and end the president's right of collective pardon. They would allow the president to address parliament in-session, and parliament to set its own agenda. They would give parliament a veto over some presidential appointments, while ending government control over parliament's committee system. He has claimed that these reforms strengthen parliament, while some opposition socialist lawmakers have described it as a "consolidation of a monocracy".

International affairs

During his 2007 presidential campaign, Sarkozy promised a strengthening of the entente cordiale with the United Kingdom and closer cooperation with the United States.

Sarkozy wielded special international power when France held the rotating EU Council Presidency from July 2008 through December 2008. Sarkozy has publicly stated his intention to attain EU approval of a progressive energy package before the end of his EU Presidency. This energy package would clearly define climate change objectives for the EU and hold members to specific reductions in emissions. In further support of his collaborative outlook on climate change, Sarkozy has led the EU into a partnership with China. On 6 December 2008, Nicolas Sarkozy, as part of France's then presidency of the Council of the EU, met the Dalai Lama in Poland and outraged China, which has announced that it would postpone the China-EU summit indefinitely.

On 3 April 2009, at the NATO Summit in Strasbourg, Sarkozy announced that France would offer asylum to a former Guantanamo captive.
"We are on the path to failure if we continue to act as we have", French President Nicolas Sarkozy cautioned at the U.N. Climate Summit on 22 September 2009.

On 5 January 2009, Sarkozy called for a ceasefire plan for the Gaza Strip Conflict. The plan, which was jointly proposed by Sarkozy and Egyptian ex-President Hosni Mubarak envisions the continuation of the delivery of aid to Gaza and talks with Israel on border security, a key issue for Israel as it says Hamas smuggles its rockets into Gaza through the Egyptian border. Welcoming the proposal, US Secretary of State Condoleezza Rice called for a "ceasefire that can endure and that can bring real security".

Military intervention in Libya
Muammar Gaddafi's official visit to Nicolas Sarkozy in December 2007 triggered a strong wave of protests against the President in France.

In March 2011, after having been criticized for his unwillingness to support the Egyptian and Tunisian revolutions, and persuaded by the philosopher Bernard-Henri Levy to have France actively engage against the forces of the Libyan leader, Muammar Gaddafi, Nicolas Sarkozy was amongst the first Heads of State to demand the resignation of Gaddafi and his government, which was then fighting a civil war in Libya. On 10 March 2011, Nicolas Sarkozy welcomed to the Elysee Palace, three emissaries from the Libyan National Transitional Council (NTC), brought to him by Bernard-Henri Levy who mediated at the meeting. Nicolas Sarkozy promised them a no-fly zone would be imposed on Gaddafi's aeroplanes. He also promised them French military assistance. On 17 March 2011, at the behest of France, resolution 1973 was adopted by the Security Council of the United Nations, permitting the creation of a "no fly" zone over Libya, and for the undertaking of "necessary measures" for the protection of the country's civilian population. On 19 March 2011, Nicolas Sarkozy officially announced the beginning of a military intervention in Libya, with France's participation. These actions of Nicolas Sarkozy were favorably received by the majority of the French political class and public opinion.

In 2016, the Foreign Affairs Committee of the British Parliament published a report stating that the military intervention "was based on erroneous assumptions" that the threat of a massacre of civilian populations has been "overvalued" and that the coalition "Has not verified the real threat to civilians"; He also believes that the true motivations of Nicolas Sarkozy were to serve French interests and to "improve his political situation in France".

2012 presidential campaign

Sarkozy was one of ten candidates who qualified for the first round of voting. François Hollande, the Socialist Party candidate, received the most votes in the first round held on 22 April election, with Sarkozy coming second, meaning that both progressed to the second round of voting on 5–6 May 2012. Sarkozy lost in the runoff and conceded to Hollande. He received an estimated 48.38% compared to Hollande's 51.62%.

Post-presidency

Temporary retirement: 2012–2014
After his defeat at the 2012 election, Nicolas Sarkozy asked his supporters to respect Hollande's victory. He invited his successor to attend his last 8 May Victory in Europe Day commemoration in office. His last day as President of the French Republic was 15 May.

Shortly after, Sarkozy briefly considered a career in private equity and secured a €250 million commitment from the Qatar Investment Authority to back his planned buyout firm. He abandoned his private equity plans when he decided to make a political comeback in 2014.

Return to politics: 2014–2016

On 19 September 2014, Sarkozy announced that he was returning to politics and would run for chairman of the UMP party. and was elected to the post on 29 November 2014. Led by Sarkozy, UMP won over two-thirds of the 102 local departements in the nationwide elections on 29 March 2015. On 13 December, the Republicans won the majority of regional office races, another set of national elections. (On 30 May the UMP's name was changed to the Republicans.)

2017 retirement from politics
In January 2016, Sarkozy published the book La France pour la vie. In August 2016, he announced his candidacy for 2016 Republican presidential primary in November 2016, but only came in third place behind François Fillon and Alain Juppé. He decided to endorse Fillon and signaled that he was retiring from politics.

Being defeated at the Republican presidential primary in 2016, he retired from public life. He was charged with corruption by French prosecutors in two cases, notably concerning the alleged Libyan interference in the 2007 French elections. At issue for Sarkozy were campaign costs exceeding the maximum allowed, and how they were paid. In 2021, Sarkozy was convicted of corruption in two separate trials. His first conviction resulted in him receiving a sentence of three years, two of them suspended and one in prison; he has appealed against the ruling. For his second conviction in September 2021, he received a one-year sentence, which he is allowed to serve under home confinement; his lawyer said he would appeal this decision.

He is still a force in conservative politics in France. “Sarkozy retired from active politics in 2017, but is still playing a role behind the scenes. French media have reported that he is involved in the process of choosing a conservative candidate ahead of France's presidential election next year.

But the pair of convictions could force Sarkozy to play a more discreet role in 2022’s presidential race.”

Sarkozy endorsed Emmanuel Macron in the April 2022 election.

In February 2023, Sarkozy together with his wife and daughter visited the western wall where they expressed their enthusiasm for the “exciting place” as well as their deep friendship with Israel.

Other activities

Corporate boards
 Lagardère Group, Member of the Supervisory Board (since 2020)
 Accor, Independent Member of the Board of Directors and Chairman of the International Strategy Committee (since 2017)
 Groupe Lucien Barrière, Member of the Board of Directors (since 2019)

Non-profit organizations
 Berggruen Institute, Member of the 21st Century Council
 Schwarzman Scholars, Honorary Member of the Advisory Board

Public image
Sarkozy was named the 68th best-dressed person in the world by Vanity Fair, alongside David Beckham and Brad Pitt. However, Sarkozy has also been named as the third worst-dressed person in the world by GQ. Beside publicising, at times, and at others, refusing to publicise his ex-wife Cécilia Ciganer-Albéniz's image, Sarkozy takes care of his own personal image, sometimes to the point of censorship—such as in the Paris Match affair, when he allegedly forced its director to resign following an article on his ex-wife and her affair with Publicis executive Richard Attias, or pressures exercised on the Journal du dimanche, which was preparing to publish an article concerning Ciganer-Albéniz's decision not to vote in the second round of the 2007 presidential election. In its edition of 9 August 2007, Paris Match retouched a photo of Sarkozy in order to erase a love handle. His official portrait destined for all French town halls was done by Sipa Press photographer Philippe Warrin, better known for his paparazzi work.

Former Daily Telegraph journalist Colin Randall has highlighted Sarkozy's tighter control of his image and frequent interventions in the media: "he censors a book, or fires the chief editor of a weekly." Sarkozy is reported by Reuters to be sensitive about his height (believed to be ). The French media have pointed out that Carla Bruni frequently wears flats when in public with him. In 2009, a worker at a factory where Sarkozy gave a speech said she was asked to stand next to him because she was of a similar height to Sarkozy. (This story was corroborated by some trade union officials.) This was the subject of a political row: the president's office called the accusation "completely absurd and grotesque", while the Socialist Party mocked his fastidious preparation.

Sarkozy lost a suit against a manufacturer of Sarkozy voodoo dolls, in which he claimed that he had a right to his own image.

Sarkozy was nicknamed as Hyper-president or hyperpresident  by some French media after his 2007 election as president, to describe his desire to control everything. Whereas in the history of the Fifth Republic, the successive presidents were traditionally focused on the foreign policy of the country and on international relations, leaving the Prime Minister and the government to determine the domestic policy, as the Constitution states it, Nicolas Sarkozy appeared to determine both the foreign and domestic policy. Some compared Nicolas Sarkozy to Napoléon Bonaparte and Louis XIV. Indeed, he appointed a very close friend of his, François Fillon, as a Prime Minister. Fillon was accused of being an instrument of the President's power.

The biopic The Conquest is a 2011 film that dramatizes Sarkozy's rise to power, with candid portrayals of Nicolas Sarkozy himself, Chirac and Villepin. It was shown at the 2011 Cannes Film Festival.

Controversies

Sarkozy is generally disliked by the left and has been criticised by some on the right, most vocally by moderate Gaullist supporters of Jacques Chirac and Dominique de Villepin. The communist-leaning magazine L'Humanité accused Sarkozy of populism.

Views on religions

In 2004 Sarkozy co-authored a book, La République, les religions, l'espérance (The Republic, Religions, and Hope), in which he argued that the young should not be brought up solely on secular or republican values. He advocated reducing the separation of church and state, arguing for the government subsidies for mosques to encourage Islamic integration into French society. He has opposed financing of religious institutions with funds from outside France. After meeting with Tom Cruise, Sarkozy was criticized by some for meeting with a member of the Church of Scientology, which has been seen by some as a cult. Sarkozy was criticized by some after he claimed "the roots of France are essentially Christian" at a December 2007 speech in Rome. Similarly, he drew criticism after he called Islam "one of the greatest and most beautiful civilizations the world has known" at a speech in Riyadh in January 2008.

Controversial statements
In the midst of a tense period and following the death of an 11-year-old boy, caught in the crossfire of a gang brawl in the Paris suburb of La Courneuve in June 2005, Sarkozy went to the scene and said: "on va nettoyer au Kärcher la cité"" ("we will clean the area with a pressure washer"). Two days before the 2005 Paris riots, he referred to young criminals of nearby housing projects as "voyous" ("thugs") and "racaille", a slang term which can be translated into English as "rabble", "scum" or "riff-raff", in answer to resident who addressed Sarkozy with "Quand nous débarrassez-vous de cette racaille?" ("When will you rid us of these dregs?"). The French Communist Party publication, L'Humanité, branded this language as inappropriate. Following Sarkozy's use of the word racaille many people in the banlieues identified him as a politician of the far right. His period as Minister of the Interior saw the use of police as shock troops in the "banlieues", and a police "raid" on the suburb of Clichy-sous-Bois in October 2005 led to two boys being electrocuted in a power sub-station. The riots began that night.

In September 2005 Sarkozy was accused of pushing for a hasty inquiry into an arson attack on a police station in Pau, of which the alleged perpetrators were acquitted for lack of proof. On 22 June 2005 Sarkozy told law enforcement officials that he had questioned the Minister of Justice about the future of "the judge" who had freed a man on parole who had later committed a murder.

A few weeks before the first round of the 2007 presidential elections, Sarkozy had an interview with philosopher Michel Onfray. Sarkozy stated that disorders such as paedophilia and depression have a genetic as well as social basis, saying "... I'd be inclined to think that one is born a paedophile, and it is actually a problem that we do not know how to cure this disease"; he claimed that suicides among youth were linked to genetic predispositions by stating, "I don't want to give parents a complex. It's not exclusively the parents' fault every time a youngster commits suicide." These statements were criticised by some scientists, including geneticist Axel Kahn. Sarkozy later added, "What part is innate and what part is acquired? At least let's debate it, let's not close the door to all debate."

On 27 July 2007, Sarkozy delivered a speech in Dakar, Senegal, written by Henri Guaino, in which he claimed that "the African has never really entered into history". The controversial remarks were widely condemned by Africans, with some viewing them as racist. South African president Thabo Mbeki praised Sarkozy's speech, which raised criticism by some in the South African media.

On 30 July 2010, Sarkozy suggested a new policy of security, and he proposed "stripping foreign-born French citizens who opted to acquire their nationality at their majority of their citizenship if they are convicted of threatening the life of a police officer or other serious crimes". This policy has been criticized for example by the US newspaper The New York Times, by Sarkozy's political opponents, including the Socialist Party leader Martine Aubry, and by experts of French law, including the  ex-member of the Constitutional Council of France, Robert Badinter, who said that such action would be unconstitutional.

He called for coercive methods to promote "métissage," cultural mixing (which can sometimes include genetic mixing), which he called an "obligation" during a press conference on 17 December 2008.

"Casse-toi, pauv'con"
On 23 February 2008, Sarkozy was filmed by a reporter for French newspaper Le Parisien having the following exchange while visiting the Paris International Agricultural Show:While quickly crossing the hall Saturday morning, in the middle of the crowd, Sarkozy encounters a recalcitrant visitor who refuses to shake his hand. "Ah no, don't touch me!", said the man. The president retorted immediately: "Get lost, then." "You're making me dirty", yelled the man. With a frozen smile, Sarkozy says, his teeth glistening, a refined "Get lost, then, poor dumb-ass, go." A precise translation into English has many possible variations.

On 28 August 2008, Hervé Eon, from Laval came to an anti-Sarkozy demonstration with a sign bearing the words Casse-toi pov' con, the exact words Sarkozy had uttered. Eon was arrested for causing offence to the presidential function and the prosecutor, who in France indirectly reports to the president, requested a fine of €1000. The court eventually imposed a symbolic €30 suspended fine, which has generally been interpreted as a defeat for the prosecution side. This incident was widely reported on, in particular as Sarkozy, as president of the Republic, is immune from prosecution, notably restricting Eon's rights to sue Sarkozy for defamation.

Position on the Iraq war
Sarkozy opposed the U.S.-led invasion of Iraq. However, he was critical of the way Chirac and his foreign minister Dominique de Villepin expressed France's opposition to the war. Talking at the French-American Foundation in Washington, D.C. on 12 September 2006, he denounced what he called the "French arrogance" and said: "It is bad manners to embarrass one's allies or sound like one is taking delight in their troubles." He added: "We must never again turn our disagreements into a crisis." Chirac reportedly said in private that Sarkozy's speech was "appalling" and "a shameful act".

Accusations of nepotism
In October 2009, Sarkozy was accused of nepotism for helping his son, Jean, try to become head of the public body running France's biggest business district EPAD. On 3 July 2012, French police raided Sarkozy's residence and office as part of a probe into claims that Sarkozy was involved in illegal political campaign financing.

Political and financial scandals and criminal conviction
On 5 July 2010, following its investigations on the Bettencourt affair, online newspaper Mediapart ran an article in which Claire Thibout, a former accountant of billionairess Liliane Bettencourt, accused Sarkozy and Eric Woerth of receiving illegal campaign donations in 2007, in cash. 

On 1 July 2014 Sarkozy was detained for questioning by police over claims he had promised a prestigious role in Monaco to a high-ranking judge, Gilbert Azibert, in exchange for information about the investigation into alleged illegal campaign funding.  Mr Azibert, one of the most senior judges at the Court of Appeal, was called in for questioning on 30 June 2014.  It is believed to be the first time a former French president has been held in police custody, although his predecessor, Jacques Chirac, was found guilty of embezzlement and breach of trust while he was mayor of Paris and given a suspended prison sentence in 2011. After 15 hours in police custody, Sarkozy was put under official investigation for "active corruption", "misuse of influence" and "obtained through a breach of professional secrecy" on 2 July 2014. Mr Azibert and Sarkozy's lawyer, Thierry Herzog, are also now under official investigation. The two accusations carry sentences of up to 10 years in prison. The developments were seen as a blow to Sarkozy's attempts to challenge for the presidency in 2017. Nevertheless, he later stood as a candidate for the Republican party nomination, but was eliminated from the contest in November 2016. A trial on this case, Sarkozy's first, started on 23 November 2020.

On 16 February 2016, Sarkozy was indicted on "illegal financing of political campaign" charges related to overspending in his 2012 presidential campaign and retained as witness in connection with the Bygmalion scandal.

In April 2016, Arnaud Claude, former law partner of Sarkozy, was named in the Panama Papers.

On 23 November 2020, the trial of Nicolas Sarkozy started who is accused of corruption and influence peddling, for an attempted bribery of a judge. The trial was postponed until November 26, following a request from one of his co-defendants for health reasons.

On 1 March 2021, a court in Paris found former French President Nicolas Sarkozy guilty of corruption, trading in influence in a wiretapping and illegal data exchange case involving a number of individuals like magistrate Gilbert Azibert and Sarkozy's former lawyer Thierry Herzog. Both men were tried with him and convicted as well. Sarkozy and his two co-defendants were sentenced to three years, two of them suspended, and one in prison. Sarkozy appealed the ruling, which suspends its application.

On 20 May 2021, a second criminal trial, this time pertaining to the Bygmalion Scandal related to illegal campaign funding, began for Sarkozy, as well as 13 other defendants who were said to have been involved in the Bygmalion scandal. Sarkozy's second corruption trial involved allegations of diverting tens of millions of euros which was intended to be spent on the his failed 2012 re-election campaign and then hiring a PR firm to cover it up. The illicit campaign finance money was instead used to overspend on lavish campaign rallies and events. On 30 September 2021, Sarkozy, as well as his co-defendants, was convicted. For this conviction, Sarkozy was given a 1-year prison sentence, though he was also given the option to serve this sentence at home with an electronic bracelet.

Alleged Libyan agent of influence

Shortly after his inauguration as President of France in 2007, Nicolas Sarkozy invited Libyan leader Muammar Gaddafi to France over the objections of both the political opposition, and members of his own government. The visit marked the first time Gaddafi had been to France in more than 35 years and, during it, France agreed to sell Libya 21 Airbus aircraft and signed a nuclear cooperation agreement. Negotiations for the purchase of more than a dozen Dassault Rafale fighter jets, plus military helicopters, were also initiated during the trip.

During the 2011 Libyan Civil War – a conflict in which France intervened – Saif-al-Islam Gaddafi said in an interview with euronews that the Libyan state had donated €50 million to Sarkozy's 2007 presidential campaign in exchange for access and favors by Sarkozy.

Investigative website Mediapart subsequently published several documents appearing to prove a payment of €50 million, and also published a claim by Ziad Takieddine (disclaimer by the same person in another video) that he had personally handed three briefcases stuffed with cash to Sarkozy. French magistrates later acquired diaries of former Libyan oil minister Shukri Ghanem in which payments to Sarkozy were mentioned. Shortly thereafter, however, Ghanem was found dead, floating in the Danube in Austria and thereby preventing his corroboration of the diaries.

In January 2018, British police arrested Alexandre Djouhri on a European Arrest Warrant. Djouhri was an associate of Sarkozy and had refused to respond to a French judicial summons for questioning over allegations he had helped launder Libyan funds on behalf of Sarkozy.

Political career

President of the French Republic: 2007–2012.
Member of the Constitutional Council of France: since 2012.

Governmental functions
Minister of Budget and government's spokesman: 1993–1995.
Minister of Communication and government's spokesman: 1994–1995.
Minister of State, minister of Interior, of the Internal Security and Local Freedoms: 2002–2004.
Minister of State, minister of Economy, Finance and Industry: March–November 2004 (resignation).
Minister of State, minister of Interior and Land Planning: 2005–2007 (resignation).

Electoral mandates

European Parliament
Member of the European Parliament: July–September 1999 (resignation). Elected in 1999.

National Assembly of France
Member of the National Assembly of France for Hauts-de-Seine (6th constituency): 1988–1993 (became minister in 1993) / 1995–2002 (became minister in 2002) / March–June 2005 (became minister in June 2005). Elected in 1988, reelected in 1993, 1995, 1997, 2002, 2005.

Regional Council
Regional councillor of Île-de-France: 1983–1988 (resignation). Elected in 1986.

General Council
President of the General Council of Hauts-de-Seine: 2004–2007 (resignation, became President of the French Republic in 2007).
Vice-president of the General Council of Hauts-de-Seine: 1986–1988 (resignation).
General councillor of Hauts-de-Seine, elected in the canton of Neuilly-sur-Seine-Nord: 1985–1988 / 2004–2007 (Resignation, became President of the French Republic in 2007).

Municipal Council
Mayor of Neuilly-sur-Seine: 1983–2002 (resignation). Reelected in 1989, 1995, and 2001.
Deputy-mayor of Neuilly-sur-Seine: 2002–2005 (resignation).
Municipal councillor of Neuilly-sur-Seine: 1977–2005 (resignation). Reelected in 1983, 1989, 1995, and 2001.

Political functions
President of The Republicans: 2015-2016.
President of the Union for a Popular Movement: 2004–2007 and 2014-2015 (resignation, became President of the French Republic in 2007). Reelected in 2014.
President of the Rally for the Republic: April–October 1999.
General secretary of the Rally for the Republic: 1998–1999.
Deputy general secretary of the Rally for the Republic: 1992–1993.

Awards and honours

French Honours 
 Legion of Honour
  Grand Cross (2007—automatic when taking office)
  Knight (2004)

 ex officio
  Grand Cross of the National Order of Merit (2007—automatic when taking office)

Foreign Honours 
  Gran Cross of the Order of Glory (Armenia) - 2011
  Commander of the Order of Leopold (Belgium) - 2004
  Collar of the Order of the Southern Cross (Brazil) - 2009
  First Class of the Order of the Balkan Mountains (Bulgaria) - 2007 
  Medal of the St. George's Order of Victory (Georgia) - 2011 
  Grand Cross of the Order of the Redeemer (Grèce) - 2008 
  Grand Cross of the National Order of the Ivory Coast (Ivory Coast) - 2012
  Medal of the Order of the Golden Eagle (Kazakhstan) - 2009 
  Collar of the Order of Mubarak the Great (Kuwait) - 2009 
  Extraordinary Grade	of the Order of Merit (Lebanon) - 2009 
  Collar of the Order of Muhammad (Morocco) - 2007 
  Grand Cross of the Order of Saint-Charles (Monaco) – 25 April 2008
  Collar of the Order of the Independence (Qatar) - 2008
  Collar of the Order of Abdulaziz Al Saud (Saudi Arabia) - 2008
  Knight of the Order of the Golden Fleece (Spain) – 2011
  Collar of the Order of Charles III (Spain) – 2009
  Grand Cross of the Order of Charles III (Spain) – 2004 
  Grand Cordon of the Order of the Seventh of November (Tunisia) – 28 April 2008
  First Class of the Order of Prince Yaroslav the Wise (Ukraine) – 2010
  Collar of the Order of Zayed (United Arab Emirates) – 2008 
  Honorary Knight Grand Cross of the Order of the Bath (United Kingdom) – 2008

Other Honours 
 : Proto-canon of the Papal Basilicas of St. John Lateran and St. Peter's (2007–2012; the post is held ex officio by the French Head of State)
 : Premio Mediterraneo

Notes

References

Further reading 
 
 
 , interviews with Michel Denisot
 , Grand livre du mois 1995
 , subject(s): Pratiques politiques—France—1990–, France—Politique et gouvernement—1997–2002
 
 
 
 
 
 
 
 , subject(s): Sarkozy, Nicolas (1955–)—Caricatures et dessins humoristiques
 , Grand Livre du mois 2004, subject(s): Chirac, Jacques (1932–), Sarkozy, Nicolas (1955–), France—Politique et gouvernement—1995–
 , subject(s): Laïcité—France—1990–, Islam—France—1990–

External links

Official websites
  President of France
  Website of the UMP, Sarkozy's party
  Official personal website
  2012 campaign website
  Address to the General Assembly of the United Nations during the General Debate of the 63rd Session, 23 September 2008. Nicolas Sarkozy addressed the Assembly both as President of France and as President of the European Union

Press
 Radio France International feature Sarkozy's 90-minute address to the nation, 6 February 2009
 "Hosing Sarkozy" an article in the TLS by Sudhir Hazareesingh, 28 November 2007
Interview after One Month in Office  Le Figaro, 7 June 2007
 Sarkozy takes over Chirac's UMP party (BBC News)
 Profile: Nicolas Sarkozy (BBC News)
Nicolas Sarkozy: French Choose the American Way? by David Storobin
 Vive this difference  by Suzanne Fields
 France's chance, The Economist, 12 April 2007
 Letter From Europe- Round 1 Jane Kramer, The New Yorker, 23 April 2007
 On the so-called "rupture" by Sarkozy, Mathieu Potte-Bonneville & Pierre Zaoui, Vacarme n°41, Winter 2007
 The Bettencourt/L'Oréal scandal Radio France Internationale in English
 French politics no stranger to scandals Radio France Internationale in English
 L'Oréal, scandals and the far right Radio France Internationale in English
Articles and Coverage (Guardian UK)

Related contents
 Extended biography by CIDOB Foundation
 Sarkozy's opinion poll tracker 
 Some of Sarkozy's quotations

Offices and titles 

 
1955 births
Candidates in the 2007 French presidential election
Candidates in the 2012 French presidential election
21st-century presidents of France
21st-century Princes of Andorra
21st-century French criminals
Recipients of the Order of Prince Yaroslav the Wise, 1st class
French interior ministers
20th-century French lawyers
French Roman Catholics
French Ministers of Budget
French Ministers of Finance
French politicians convicted of corruption
French people of Greek-Jewish descent
French people of Hungarian descent
Government of Andorra
Government spokespersons of France
Hungarian nobility
Living people
Mayors of places in Île-de-France
Presidents of the General Council of Hauts-de-Seine
Politicians from Paris
Presidents of the European Council
Princes of Andorra

Nicolas
Sciences Po alumni
The Republicans (France) politicians
University of Paris alumni

Commanders of the Order of the Crown (Belgium)
Grand Croix of the Légion d'honneur
Grand Crosses of the Order of Saint-Charles
Honorary Knights Grand Cross of the Order of the Bath
Paris Nanterre University alumni
Knights of the Golden Fleece of Spain
Recipients of St. George's Order of Victory